FA Youth Cup Finals from 1953 to 1959.

1952–53: Manchester United vs. Wolverhampton Wanderers (7–1 and 2–2, 9–3 aggregate)

First leg

Second leg

1953–54: Manchester United vs. Wolverhampton Wanderers (4–4 and 1–0, 5–4 aggregate)

First leg
Old Trafford, 23 May 1954
Manchester United – Wolverhampton Wanderers 4–4 (1–3)
1–0 Duncan Edwards
1–1 Joe Bonson
1–2 Jimmy Murray
1–3 Bobby Mason
2–3 David Pegg (pen.)
3–3 Duncan Edwards
3–4 John Fallon
4–4 David Pegg
Attendance: 18,246

Second leg
Molineux, 26 May 1954
Wolverhampton Wanderers – Manchester United 0–1 (0–1)
0–1 34 min. David Pegg (pen.)
Attendance: 28,651

1954–55: Manchester United vs. West Bromwich Albion (4–1 and 3–0, 7–1 aggregate)

First leg
Old Trafford, 27 April 1955
Manchester United – West Bromwich Albion 4–1 (2–0)
1–0 40 min. Bobby Charlton
2–0 43 min. Eddie Colman
3–0 67 min. Eddie Colman
3–1 68 min. Barry Hughes
4–1 85 min. Duncan Edwards
Attendance: 16,696

Second leg
The Hawthorns, 30 April 1955
West Bromwich Albion – Manchester United 0–3 (0–0)
0–1 71 min. Terry Beckett
0–2 88 min. Eddie Colman
0–3 89 min. Eddie Colman
Attendance: 8,335

1955–56: Manchester United vs. Chesterfield (3–2 and 1–1, 4–3 aggregate)

First leg
Old Trafford, 30 April 1956
Manchester United – Chesterfield 3–2 (3–0)
1–0 11 min. Joe Carolan
2–0 17 min. Mark Pearson
3–0 30 min. Bobby Charlton
3–1 60 min. Jim Mellors
3–2 88 min. Peter Ledger
Attendance: 24,544

Second leg
Recreation Ground, 7 May 1956
Chesterfield – Manchester United 1–1 (1–0)
1–0 66 min. Keith Havenhand
1–1 90 min. Dennis Fidler
Attendance: 15,838

1956–57: Manchester United vs. West Ham United (3–2 and 5–0, 8–2 aggregate)

First leg

Upton Park, 2 May 1957
West Ham United – Manchester United 2–3 (1–1)
0–1 26 min. Alex Dawson
1–1 38 min. John Cartwright
1–2 52 min. Nobby Lawton
1–3 55 min. Reg Hunter
2–3 64 min. George Fenn (pen.)
Attendance: 15,000

Second leg

Old Trafford, 7 May 1957
Manchester United – West Ham United 5–0 (3–0)
1–0 24 min. Kenny Morgans
2–0 28 min. Mark Pearson
3–0 30 min. Mark Pearson
4–0 63 min. Alex Dawson
5–0 70 min. Alex Dawson
Attendance: 15,838

1957–58: Wolverhampton Wanderers vs. Chelsea (1–5 and 6–1, 7–6 aggregate)

1958–59: Blackburn Rovers vs. West Ham United (1–1 and 1–0, 2–1 aggregate)

1950s
1952–53 in English football
1953–54 in English football
1954–55 in English football
1955–56 in English football
1956–57 in English football
1957–58 in English football
1958–59 in English football